Bob Carlton (23 June 1950 – 18 January 2018) was an English theatre director and writer. He is best known for creating and directing the jukebox musical Return to the Forbidden Planet, which won the Laurence Olivier Award for Best New Musical in both 1989 and 1990 and has been produced in many different countries around the world.  He has written several other plays and has directed episodes of the television soap operas Brookside and Emmerdale Farm.

He was born in Coventry, attended King Henry VIII School, Coventry England, read drama at the University of Hull and, after graduation, won an Arts Council Trainee Director's Bursary to the Belgrade Theatre in his hometown of Coventry. He was later associate director at the Dukes Playhouse, Lancaster and York Theatre Royal before becoming artistic director of the Bubble Theatre Company in 1979. He held this post until 1984 and while there he created and first staged Return to the Forbidden Planet.

From 1997 to 2014 he was the artistic director of the Queen's Theatre, Hornchurch. On 17 September 2014, it was announced that he was stepping down from the position to focus on his writing.

It was announced on 19 January 2018 that he had died from cancer the previous day.

References

External links
 www.filmreference.com biography
 

1950 births
2018 deaths
English theatre directors
People educated at King Henry VIII School, Coventry
Artists from Coventry